John Simeon  may refer to:
Sir John Simeon, 1st Baronet (1756–1824), Member of Parliament (MP) for Reading 1797–1802 and 1806–1818
Sir John Simeon, 3rd Baronet (1815–1870), British politician and naval officer
Sir John Simeon, 4th Baronet, MP for Southampton 1895–1906